Brachyolenecamptus is a genus of longhorn beetles of the subfamily Lamiinae.

Species
The genus contains the following species:

 Brachyolenecamptus banksi Breuning, 1948
 Brachyolenecamptus fuscosticticus Breuning, 1948

References

Dorcaschematini